Sikhism in Afghanistan in the contemporary era is limited to small populations, primarily in major cities, with the largest numbers of Afghan Sikhs living in Jalalabad, Ghazni, Kabul, and to a lesser extent in Kandahar and Khost. Sikhs have been the most prevalent non-Muslim minority in Afghanistan, and despite the many political changes in recent Afghan history, governments and political groups have generally not indulged in openly discriminating against the Sikh minority; however, their status have been severely impacted since the country's conflict since 1978. 

The origin of the Sikh community in Afghanistan has broadly two streams, including indigenous Pashto and Dari speakers, descendants of converts to the teaching of the Sikhism’s founder Guru Nanak during his trip to Kabul around 1520. The second stream derive from the later Sikh Empire as it pushed westward, establishing trading routes for Sikh merchants into Kandahar and Kabul; this group speak Hindko, a dialect of Punjabi. Due to this mixed ancestry, Afghan Sikhs are from various ethnolinguistic backgrounds including Pashtun, Hindkowan or Punjabi.

Once numbering between 200,000 and 500,000 (1.8% to 4.6% of the national population, making it among the largest of any country at that time) in the 1970s, their population in Afghanistan has dwindled since the Afghan wars began. Estimates of their total population (there has been no census in Afghanistan since 1979) have been given as around 1,200 families or 8,000 members in 2013; 1,000 in 2019 (as reported by Afghan Sikh Wolesi Jirga member Narinder Singh Khalsa); and around 70 to 80 families or 700 in 2020 (as reported by Raj Sutaka, a Sikh businessman from Kabul). Thousands of Afghan Sikhs now live in India, the United Kingdom, the United States, and Canada.

Presence

Kabul
There were over 200,000 Sikhs in Kabul in the 1980s, but after the start of the Civil War in 1992, most had fled. Seven of Kabul's eight gurdwaras were destroyed during the civil war. Only Gurdwara Karte Parwan, located in the Karte Parwan section of Kabul, remains. They are centred today in Karte Parwan and some parts of the old city. There is no exact number of Sikhs in Kabul province.

Jalalabad

As of 2001, Jalalabad had 100 Sikh families, totaling around 700 people, who worship at two large Gurdwaras. Legend states that the older of the Gurudwaras was built to commemorate the visit of Guru Nanak Dev. On 1 July 2018, at least 10 Sikhs were killed in a targeted suicide bombing at the PD1 market. The local branch of the Islamic State of Iraq and the Levant claimed responsibility.

Kandahar
Kandahar has a very small Sikh community, with only about 15 families living there as of 2002.

History

Early history
Guru Nanak visited Kabul in the 15th century. Guru Nanak is traditionally locally known as Peer Balagdaan in Afghanistan. Some early Khatri Sikhs established and maintained colonies in Afghanistan for trading purposes. Later, conflicts between the Sikh misls and empire against the Afghan-based Durrani Empire led to tension. Sikhs also served in the British Empire's military during several operations in Afghanistan in the 19th century.

20th century
Following the partition of India in 1947, the Sikh population increased as Sikh migrants fled persecution from the Pothohar region of newly formed country of Pakistan. The Sikhs prospered during the 1933-1973 reign of Mohammed Zahir Shah, and during period of strongly secular period of Soviet rule.

Wars
During the 1980s Soviet–Afghan War, many Afghan Sikhs fled to India, where 90% of global Sikh population lives; a second, much larger wave followed following the 1992 fall of the Najibullah regime. Sikh gurdwaras (temples) throughout the country were destroyed in the Battle of Jalalabad (1989) and the Afghan Civil War of the 1990s, leaving only the Gurdwara Karte Parwan in Kabul.

Under the Taliban, the Sikhs were a persecuted minority and forced to pay the jizya tax. The Sikh custom of cremation of the dead was prohibited by the Taliban, and cremation grounds vandalized. In addition, Sikhs were required to wear yellow patches or veils to identify themselves.

21st century

By tradition, Sikhs cremate their dead, an act considered sacrilege in Islam. Cremation has become a major issue among Sikh Afghans, as traditional cremation grounds have been appropriated by Muslims, particularly in the Qalacha area of Kabul, which Sikhs and Hindus had used for over a century. In 2003 Sikhs complained to the Afghan government regarding the loss of cremation grounds, which had forced them to send a dead body to Pakistan to be cremated, following which the Minister of Hajj and Religious Affairs investigated the issue. Though the grounds were reported as returned to Sikh control in 2006, in 2007 local Muslims allegedly beat Sikhs attempting to cremate a community leader, and the funeral proceeded only with police protection. As of 2010, cremation in Kabul is still reported as being disapproved of by locals.

Sikhs in Afghanistan continue to face problems, with the issue of the Sikh custom of cremation figuring prominently.

In September 2013, Afghan President Hamid Karzai signed a legislative decree, reserving a seat in the National Assembly of Afghanistan for the Hindu and Sikh minority. However this decree was blocked by the parliament. The decree eventually came into force in September 2016 when it was approved by the cabinet of Karzai's successor, Ashraf Ghani. Narendra Singh Khalsa was elected to this seat at the subsequent general election.

Following the deadly Jalalabad attack in June 2018, both Karzai and Ghani visited the Karte Parwan gurdwara to offer condolences. Ghani called the country's Sikh and Hindu minorities the "pride of the nation", and on another occasion that year called them an "integral part" of Afghanistan's history.

The country is witnessing a severe decline in the community's population with the coming of Taliban back in power. Several members sought refuge to other countries and several others are still attempting to flee their home country.

Diaspora
The population ratio between Afghan Sikhs and Hindus is estimated to be 60:40, as both populations are frequently merged in historic and contemporary estimations. Combined with a wide range of population approximations in the absence of official census data, the Afghan Sikh population was estimated to be between 200,000 and 500,000 in the 1970s.

In the ensuring decades, widespread emigration was common amongst religious minorities due to increased persecution by Taliban forces; by the 1990s, the Afghan Sikh population declined below 50,000. As of 2013, they are around 800 families of which 300 families live in Kabul. Sikh leaders in Afghanistan claim that the total number of Sikhs is 3,000. Many Sikh families have chosen to emigrate to other countries including, India, North America, the European Union, the United Kingdom, Pakistan, Russia and other places.

Notable people
 Awtar Singh, member of the National Assembly of Afghanistan
 Anarkali Kaur Honaryar, member of the Afghan Independent Human Rights Commission and 2009 Radio Free Europe Afghanistan "Person of the Year"

See also 
 Punjabis in Afghanistan
 July 2018 Jalalabad suicide bombing
 Kabul gurdwara attack

Notes

References

Further reading

External links 

 Al-Jazeera report on Afghan Sikhs
 Interviews in the Old City of Kabul
 The Afghan Sikhs face new threat. Deccan Herald, 12 November 2010
 Afghan Sikhs: Forgotten Victims. The Guardian; 6 July 2010
 Afghanistan: Sikhs rebuilding gurdwaras. Gurinder Randhawa - Indo-Asian News Service 25 Aug 2005
 300 more Afghan Sikhs flee, India waives visa terms. Times of India, 20 Oct 2001.
 A NATION CHALLENGED: LIFE IN KABUL; Keeping Their Faiths Under Taliban Rule Drew Sikhs and Hindus Together. Amy Waldman, New York Times, 20 January 2002
 Pakistan: The Embattled Sikhs in Taliban Territory

 
Ethnic groups in Nangarhar Province
Ethnic groups in Kandahar Province